Frank Yaconelli (October 2, 1898 – November 19, 1965) was an Italian-born American film actor.

Biography
When he was a child his family emigrated to the United States, settling in Boston. Yaconelli was a character actor playing supporting roles, often Southern European or Mexican immigrants. He was also a noted accordion player, and performed in a number of films. He starred alongside Jack Randall in a series of seven westerns produced by Monogram Pictures.

Selected filmography

 Señor Americano (1929)
 Call of the Flesh (1930)
 Parade of the West (1930)
 Firebrand Jordan (1930)
 A Lady's Morals (1930)
 Strawberry Roan (1933)
 The Man Who Dared (1933)
 It Happened One Night (1934)
 Flirting with Danger (1934)
 Alice Adams (1935)
 Here Comes Cookie (1935)
 Gun Play (1935)
 Five Bad Men (1935)
 Western Frontier (1935)
 Lawless Riders (1935)
 Down to the Sea (1936)
 The Three Mesquiteers (1936)
 Blazing Justice (1936)
 Romance Rides the Range (1936)
 Lucky Terror (1936)
 It Could Happen to You (1937)
 Wild West Days (1937)
 Wild Horse Canyon (1938)
 Across the Plains (1939)
 Escape to Paradise (1939)
 Trigger Smith (1939)
 Drifting Westward (1939)
 The Cheyenne Kid (1940)
 Dr. Cyclops (1940)
 Torrid Zone (1940)
 Pioneer Days (1940)
 East Side Kids (1940)
 Wild Horse Range (1940)
 Fiesta (1941)
 Lone Star Law Men (1941)
 Two in a Taxi (1941)
 The Driftin' Kid (1941)
 Riding the Sunset Trail (1941)
 They Met in Argentina (1941)
 Forced Landing (1941)
 Western Mail (1942)
 Arizona Roundup (1942)
 Where Trails End (1942)
 Man of Courage (1943)
 Slightly Scandalous (1946)
 Beauty and the Bandit (1946)
 South of Monterey (1946)
 The Thrill of Brazil (1946)
 Wild Horse Mesa (1947)
 Riding the California Trail (1947)
 Madonna of the Desert (1948)
 A Foreign Affair (1948)
 Alias the Champ (1949)
 Borderline (1950)
 September Affair (1950)
 Never a Dull Moment (1950)
 A Place in the Sun (1951)
 The Fighter (1952)
 Hangman's Knot (1952)
 The Racers (1955)
 Serenade (1956)
 Three for Jamie Dawn (1956)
 Santiago (1956)
 The Unholy Wife (1957)
 The Parson and the Outlaw (1957)
 The Black Orchid (1958)

References

Bibliography
 Drew, Bernard A. Motion Picture Series and Sequels: A Reference Guide. Routledge, 2013.

External links

1898 births
1965 deaths
People from Boston
American male film actors
Italian male film actors
Italian emigrants to the United States